William Fosgate Kirby (November 16, 1867July 26, 1934) was a Democratic Party politician from Arkansas who represented the state in the U.S. Senate from 1916 to 1921.

Kirby was born in Miller County, Arkansas, near Texarkana, on November 16, 1867, and attended common schools. He studied law at Cumberland School of Law at Cumberland University, graduating in 1885, in which year he was admitted to the bar and began practice in Texarkana. A member of the state House of Representatives in 1893 and again in 1897, Kirby served in the state senate from 1899 to 1901. In 1904, he wrote Kirby’s Digest of the Statutes of Arkansas; in 1907, he moved to Little Rock. He was the state's attorney general from 1907 to 1909 and was elected associate justice of the Arkansas Supreme Court, serving from 1910 to 1916.

He resigned upon his election to the Senate to serve out the term of James P. Clarke, who had died in office. As a senator, Kirby chaired the Committee on Expenditures in the Department of Agriculture and served on the Committee on Patents. An unsuccessful candidate for renomination in 1920 and again in 1932, he resumed his law practice upon leaving the Senate. He again became an associate justice of the state supreme court, serving from 1926 until his death; he died in Little Rock on July 26, 1934, and is buried in Texarkana.

See also
 List of United States senators from Arkansas

References

External links
 

1867 births
1934 deaths
People from Miller County, Arkansas
Democratic Party United States senators from Arkansas
Democratic Party members of the Arkansas House of Representatives
Democratic Party Arkansas state senators
Arkansas Attorneys General
Justices of the Arkansas Supreme Court